Bakanou is a village in southern Ivory Coast. It is in the sub-prefecture of Sikensi, Sikensi Department, Agnéby-Tiassa Region, Lagunes District. Bakanou is often described as two separate but adjacent villages, Bakanou A and Bakanou B.

Bakanou was a commune until March 2012, when it became one of 1126 communes nationwide that were abolished.

Notes

Former communes of Ivory Coast
Populated places in Lagunes District
Populated places in Agnéby-Tiassa